Jeremiah McLene (1767March 19, 1837) was a U.S. Representative from Ohio from 1833 to 1837, major general of militia in the American Revolutionary War, the 2nd Ohio Secretary of State from 1808 to 1831, and a state representative from 1807 to 1808. He served as a Democrat.

Early life
McLene was born in Cumberland County in the Province of Pennsylvania in 1767. As a youth he attended the common schools. During the Revolution he served in the militia at a very young age and rose to the rank of major general by the war's end in 1783.

Political career
After the war he moved west to settle in Chillicothe, Ohio. By 1806, he had been elected to the Ohio House of Representatives as a Democrat. He became Secretary of State in 1808 and served eight terms until 1831. During this time, in 1816, he moved north to Columbus, Ohio. Ohio Presidential elector in 1832 for Andrew Jackson. In 1832 he was elected to the United States House of Representatives for the Ohio's 8th congressional district and served two terms. He lost re-election to a third term in 1836 to a Whig, Joseph Ridgway.

Death
McLene died in Washington, D.C., on March 19, 1837, at age 70, before he could move back to Columbus. He is interred in the United States Congressional Cemetery.

Notes

References

1767 births
1837 deaths
Democratic Party members of the Ohio House of Representatives
People from Cumberland County, Pennsylvania
Politicians from Chillicothe, Ohio
Politicians from Columbus, Ohio
Pennsylvania militiamen in the American Revolution
Militia generals in the American Revolution
Secretaries of State of Ohio
Burials at the Congressional Cemetery
1832 United States presidential electors
Jacksonian members of the United States House of Representatives from Ohio
19th-century American politicians